Raúl Águila (16 September 1930 – 29 September 2016) was a Chilean footballer. He played in seven matches for the Chile national football team in 1956 and 1957. He was also part of Chile's squad for the 1957 South American Championship.

References

External links
 

1930 births
2016 deaths
Chilean footballers
Chile international footballers
Association football forwards
Audax Italiano footballers
Unión San Felipe footballers